No. 501 Squadron was the 14th of the 21 flying units in the Royal Auxiliary Air Force, the volunteer reserve part of the British Royal Air Force. The squadron won seven battle honours, flying Hurricane, Spitfire and Tempest fighter aircraft during World War II, and was one of the most heavily engaged units in RAF Fighter Command. In particular, the Squadron saw extensive action during the Battle of France and Battle of Britain. At present the unit is not flying any more and has a logistics role as part of No 85 Expeditionary Logistics Wing.

History

Formation and early years
The squadron was originally formed as a day-bomber unit named No 501 (City of Bristol) Squadron as part of the Special Reserve squadrons on 14 June 1929, made up of volunteers and regulars, flying D.H.9As, which were later replaced with Westland Wapitis and later still with Westland Wallaces. In 1936 it became "No 501 (County of Gloucester) Squadron", changing the name to embrace a larger area of recruitment. On 1 May 1936 it was transferred to the Auxiliary Air Force and in July of that year the squadron converted to Hawker Harts. In March 1938 these were exchanged for Hawker Hinds, but at the end of 1938 No. 501 squadron was transferred from RAF Bomber Command to RAF Fighter Command, and Hawker Hurricanes began to arrive in March 1939.

Second World War
When war was declared in September 1939, 501 Squadron was based at RAF Filton, near Bristol.

On 10 May 1940, with the attack on France, the Squadron became part of the Advanced Air Striking Force and moved to France where it saw extensive action, stationed at airfields as Bétheniville, Anglure, Le Mans and Dinard. Sgt J.H. "Ginger" Lacey of 501 Squadron shot down three enemy aircraft in a single day to win the Croix de Guerre. (He later returned to England with five victories.) After the retreat from France through Saint Helier, Jersey, its battle-hardened pilots were reorganised at RAF Croydon and then moved on to RAF Middle Wallop and later RAF Gravesend (now Gravesend Airport). It subsequently served at RAF Kenley, south London, commanded by S/L Harry Hogan, until 17 December 1940 by which time the squadron had claimed 149 enemy aircraft destroyed. Success came at a high cost; in addition to the heavy losses suffered in France, the squadron lost 19 pilots killed during the Battle of Britain, more than any other squadron.

The squadron re-equipped with the Supermarine Spitfire in April 1941 and the squadron moved to Northern Ireland in October 1942. In April 1943 the squadron returned to Tangmere for bomber escort work – some pilots being issued with the Spitfire Mk IXc. Between November 1943 and October 1944 the squadron formed part of Air Defence of Great Britain (ADGB). For Operation Overlord (the Allied invasion of Normandy) it flew the Spitfire V LF operating from RAF Friston in ADGB, though under the operational control of RAF Second Tactical Air Force.

During August 1944, the squadron began converting to the Tempest Mk.V at RAF Manston, for the purposes of Operation Diver – the interception of V-1 missiles.  On 23 August, a Tempest flight from the elite Fighter Interception Unit (FIU) was merged into 501 Squadron and S/L Joe Berry of FIU was appointed commanding officer of the combined unit.

The squadron was disbanded at RAF Hunsdon at the end of the war on 20 April 1945. During World War II the pilots of No. 501 Squadron had flown 11,140 operational sorties, in which they shot down 201 enemy aircraft and at least 84 V-1s.

Notable squadron members

The squadron included several notable pilots of World War II, including Sergeant Pilot Antoni (Toni) Głowacki VM, CV and 3 bars, DFC, DFM, who shot down five German aircraft on 24 August 1940 to become the first of only two pilots to achieve "Ace-in-a-day" status during the Battle of Britain. Among others who achieved fighter ace status were Ken Mackenzie, "Ginger" Lacey, Stanisław Skalski, DSO, DFC and two Bar, Robert Dafforn, Paul Farnes DFM, Kenneth Lee, and Percy Morfill. Lacey was one of the highest scoring pilots in the Battle of Britain. Squadron Leader Joseph Berry, DFC & 2 bars, was the top scoring V-1 (flying bomb) ace of the squadron, though he claimed only 10 of his 61 victories whilst flying 501 squadron In addition to these unmanned missiles he also shot down three enemy aircraft.

Into the jet age
The squadron was reformed on 10 May 1946 as an Auxiliary Air Force fighter squadron at RAF Filton. In February 1957, Flt Lt John Crossley flew Vampire FB.9 jet WR260 beneath the Clifton Suspension Bridge, before a fatal crash into Leigh Woods. This was the last recorded – and only jet aircraft – flight under that bridge. The Squadron was disbanded in March 1957, along with all the other Auxiliary units.

Present role
In June 2001 No. 501 squadron was reformed in the Force Protection role as 501 (Operational Support) Squadron in 2001 at RAF Brize Norton. 501 Squadrons Gunners provide a reserve of trained manpower for 1 Squadron RAF Regiment, No 4 Force Protection Wing. In 2003, its personnel deployed as part of Operation Telic, the liberation of Iraq. The squadron continues to deploy personnel on Force Protection duties in this region. In 2006 the first 501 Squadron Gunners deployed with 2 Squadron RAF Regiment to Afghanistan, carrying out force protection duties of Kandahar airfield and surrounding areas. This has been continued with members of both Regiment and FP roles mobilising with 1 Squadron RAF Regiment tour of the region (8 August to 9 March). Between November 2006 and April 2007 501 Squadron Gunners also deployed with the Queens Colour Squadron, 63 Squadron RAF Regiment to Basra Iraq.
Based at RAF Brize Norton in Oxfordshire, 501 (County of Gloucester) Squadron has been newly re-formed to expand the RAF Reserves Logistics capability, recruiting Logistics Officers, Drivers and Suppliers as part of No 85 Expeditionary Logistics Wing of the RAF A4 Force.

Aircraft operated

*=Remained in service after replacement as main equipment

Squadron Stations

Commanding officers

References

Notes

Bibliography

Further reading

 Darlow, Steve. Five of the Few: survivors of the Battle of Britain & the Blitz tell their story. London; Grub Street, 2006. .
 Delve, Ken. D-Day: The Air Battle, London: Arms & Armour Press, 1994, .
 Mackenzie, Wing Commander Kenneth William., DFC, AFC, AE. Hurricane Combat. Grenville Publishing, 1990. .
 Ogley, Bob. Surrey at War. Froglets Publications Ltd., 1995. .
 Wilkinson, Bill. One Pilots War published by Windsor book limited, 2010.

External links

 Royal Air Force website
 History of No.'s 500–520 Squadrons at RAF Web
 ARRSE-Pedia: The source for the otherwise unsupported facts that need additional citations
 Hawker Hurricane of 501 Squadron

501 Squadron
Military units and formations established in 1929
Fighter squadrons of the Royal Air Force in World War II
Military history of Bristol
Military units and formations in Gloucestershire
Military units and formations disestablished in 1957